Tahar Lachheb is a paralympic athlete from Tunisia competing mainly in category F58 discus events.

Tahar won the bronze medal in the F58 discus at the 2000 Summer Paralympics.  He returned four years later to the 2004 Summer Paralympics but failed to match this achievement in either the discus or the pentathlon.

References

Paralympic athletes of Tunisia
Athletes (track and field) at the 2000 Summer Paralympics
Athletes (track and field) at the 2004 Summer Paralympics
Paralympic bronze medalists for Tunisia
Living people
Medalists at the 2000 Summer Paralympics
Tunisian male discus throwers
Year of birth missing (living people)
Place of birth missing (living people)
Paralympic medalists in athletics (track and field)
20th-century Tunisian people
21st-century Tunisian people
Wheelchair discus throwers
Paralympic discus throwers